"Isoptericola rhizophila"  is a Gram-positive bacterium from the genus of Isoptericola which has been isolated from rhizospheric soil from the tree Ficus benghalensis from the Bhitarkanika mangrove forest in India.

References 

Micrococcales
Bacteria described in 2014